Guan County is a county of western Shandong province, People's Republic of China, bordered by Hebei province to the west. It is administered by Liaocheng City.

History 
As an isolated county, with relatively low education levels and a weak orthodox gentry, Guan long served as center for secret societies and heterodox sects. For example Guan was one of the earliest places where Yi-he boxing was practised, namely in 1779. This material arts style later served as base for the prominent Yìhéquán (Boxer) movement. In 1861–63, the county was also the center of a rebellion against the Qing dynasty, led by Song Jing-shi and supported by the White Lotus. In the last decades of the Qing Empire and the early Republic, Guan County was home to the Red as well as Green Gangs, the Yellow Sand Society, and the "Way of the Sages".

Administrative divisions
As 2012, this County is divided to 3 subdistricts, 7 towns and 8 townships.
Subdistricts
 Qingquan Subdistrict
 Chongwen Subdistrict
 Yanzhuang Subdistrict

Towns

Townships

Climate

References

Bibliography

External links
  Official homepage

Guan
Liaocheng